David Mills (born 1 June 1981) is a former Wales international rugby league footballer who played as a  in the 2000s and 2010s. 

He played for the Widnes Vikings, Harlequins RL  in two separate spells, Hull Kingston Rovers, Leigh Centurions, Swinton Lions and the North Wales Crusaders. He also played for Lancashire in the War of the Roses.

Background
Mills was born in Widnes, Cheshire, England, he has Welsh ancestors, and eligible to play for Wales due to the grandparent rule, as he is the son of the Welsh rugby league footballer; 'Big Jim' Mills.

Playing career
He has previously played for his hometown club Widnes Vikings.

He joined Hull Kingston Rovers for the 2008 season after they avoided relegation in 2007's Super League XII.

He was named as captain of the Wales squad to face England at the Keepmoat Stadium prior to England's departure for the 2008 Rugby League World Cup.

Crusaders and Castleford were interested in signing Mills due to Hull Kingston Rovers looking to release him to make way for Joel Clinton, however he joined (though never played for) newly formed Welsh club South Wales Scorpions.

On 14 May 2010, he returned to Harlequins in a one-month loan agreement.

Mills spent the 2011 season with Leigh Centurions, winning the 2011 Northern Rail Cup in the process before signing for Swinton Lions ahead of the 2012 season.

References

External links
(archived by web.archive.org) Quins RL profile

1981 births
Living people
English people of Welsh descent
English rugby league players
Hull Kingston Rovers players
Lancashire rugby league team players
Leigh Leopards players
London Broncos players
North Wales Crusaders players
Rugby league props
Rugby league players from Widnes
Rugby league second-rows
Swinton Lions players
Wales national rugby league team captains
Wales national rugby league team players
Widnes Vikings players